The 1972 Houston Cougars football team represented the University of Houston as an independent during the 1972 NCAA University Division football season. Led by 11th-year head coach Bill Yeoman, the Cougars compiled a record of 6–4–1.

Schedule

Personnel

References

Houston
Houston Cougars football seasons
Houston Cougars football